Chester Luther Jenkins (July 14, 1938 – July 14, 2009) was the first African-American mayor of Durham, North Carolina, serving from 1989 to 1991, after having previously served on the Durham City Council for eight years. In 1994, following the defeat of his 1991 re-election bid, Jenkins became the city's Director of Human Relations, holding that post until late 2000.

References

African-American mayors in North Carolina
Durham, North Carolina City Council members
2009 deaths
Mayors of Durham, North Carolina
Year of birth uncertain
1938 births
African-American city council members in North Carolina
20th-century American politicians
20th-century African-American politicians
21st-century African-American people